The Plast National Scout Organization of Ukraine (Plast Natsionalna Skautska Orhanizatsiia Ukrayiny), commonly called Ukrainian Plast or simply Plast, is the largest Scouting organization in Ukraine.

History

First Era: 1911–1920

Plast was founded in Lviv (Lwów, Lemberg), Austro-Hungarian Galicia in 1911 as the Ukrainian Scout Organization.  Ukrainian Scouting has been known since its inception as "Plast".  In Ukrainian a plastun is an historical name for a Cossack scout and sentry serviceman.  The founder of Ukrainian Scouting, Dr. Oleksander Tysovsky, affectionately known as "Drot," adapted the universal Scout principles to the needs and interests of Ukrainian youth.

Born during great social and political upheavals in Europe, Ukrainian Plast came into being to fulfill specific national aims, unlike other Scout organizations. The first Scout troops were formed in Lviv in 1911 by Petro Franko and Ivan Chmola. Plast is generally deemed to have been officially founded by Dr. Oleksander Tysovsky on 12 April 1912, at the Lviv Academic Gymnasium.

Scouting spread rapidly to the other cities and towns, and by 1913 the first Supreme Scout Council had been formed and the first handbook published.  The same year, the Orhanizatsiyniy Plast Komitet was formed in Lviv by Plast groups from different regions, and the first hiking camp was organized.

By 1916, its membership exceeded 10,000, and it was a fully developed and functioning organization, consisting of separate branches of Boy Scouts and Girl Guides. Ukrainian Plast held regular camps for Cubs, Scouts and Rovers, training courses for leaders, and produced a variety of Scout publications, including a Ukrainian translation of Scouting for Boys.

Shortly after its founding, World War I brought about the collapse of the two powers occupying ethnic Ukrainian territory, Austria-Hungary and the Russian Empire, and the formation of the Ukrainian National Republic in 1918. The subsequent years witnessed a great upswing in Scouting, as it spread into the towns and communities where it had been previously unknown, mainly in the newly freed central provinces of Ukraine. Hundreds, if not thousands, of boys, inspired by the ideals of service to God and Country which Scouting engenders, volunteered to join the armed forces, fighting on several fronts, and many gave their lives.

Second Era: 1920–1930
The Soviet victory in the civil war in 1922 led to an immediate abolition of all non-communist scout activities in this region. In the Romanian area of Bukovina, the development of Plast was likewise hampered. Ukrainian Scouting was among the first to suffer what later became the fate of many Scout Associations throughout the world. In areas later to become western Ukraine, which included parts of Czechoslovakia and Poland, the Scout movement emerged from the ruins of war with renewed vitality.  During this period, Ukrainian Scouting first requested international recognition, but was denied on political grounds.

In spite of numerous obstacles, Plast developed rapidly in the Polish areas, with high levels of membership among students, farmers and workers. A key sponsor was Metropolitan Andrey Sheptytsky, the Archbishop of the Ukrainian Greek Catholic Church (1901–1944), who donated a campsite called "Sokil" in the Carpathian Mountains. A number of publications are introduced, including the official organ Molode Zhyttia and Dr. Oleksander Tysovsky's seminal handbook, Zhyttia v Plasti.

In the late 1920s, external pressure on the part of the Polish authorities seriously impaired further growth of Plast on its territory, and eventually led to an outright abolition of Ukrainian Scouting in 1928 in the Volyn region, and in Halychyna in 1930. However, Plast continued to flourish in Carpathian Ruthenia, the ethnic Ukrainian area within Czechoslovakia, and maintained a close liaison with the underground Scout units in parts of central Ukraine under the Soviet Union until World War II and Western Ukraine under Poland. The Plast groups in Carpathian Ruthenia and Prague were members of the Union of Junak Scouts and Guides of the Republic of Czechoslovakia and through this federation of the two World organizations. A headquarters was opened in Prague. Ukrainian Scouts took part in the 3rd World Scout Jamboree at Arrowe Park, England, in 1929, and as part of the Czechoslovak contingent in the 4th Jamboree at Gödöllő, Hungary, in 1933, attempting to make world scouting aware of the suppression of free Scout activities in Ukraine.

Third Era: 1930-1944
In Western Ukraine, Plast, though banned, continued to operate illegally and conspirationally under the auspices of the Plast Center.  Plast activities continued to be undertaken, via the Commission of Educational Campsites, the "Ridna Shkola" and published in the journal Vohni.

The Polish leadership pursued this activity and punished such activities with arrests and internment.

By 1939, World War II broke out and membership in Plast saw a resurgence in western Ukraine, although the occupying German forces again banned Plast, yet activity continued.  As in the previous war, many plastuny took up arms in various armies that traversed western and eastern Ukraine during the war.

During the years under Communism and the Soviet Union, Scouting was banned in Ukraine, but the Plast organization continued to exist in exile around the world.

Fourth Era: 1945–1950

Ukrainian Scouting was hampered by World War II, but Plast managed to survive the war and began to flourish again in the displaced persons camps under the occupation of the Western Powers. The successful commemoration of the 35th Anniversary of the Movement in 1947 was the highlight of Plast activities at that time. Multiple groups of plastuny met at the Holovna Plastova Rada in Munich.

Ukrainian Scouting became a member of the Displaced Persons Division of the Boy Scouts International Bureau. A delegation of over 40 Scouts and Scouters participated in the sixth World Scout Jamboree at Moisson in 1947 and a smaller group in the seventh World Jamboree at Bad Ischl in 1951.

After the mass resettlement of Ukrainians between 1948 and 1950, Plast was reorganized and branches permanently established in a number of western countries with large Ukrainian communities, such as the United States, Canada, Australia, France, Austria, the United Kingdom, Germany and Argentina, where it continues to flourish and expand.

Fifth Era: 1950–1989
Ukrainian Scouting was represented at the ninth World Scout Jamboree at Sutton Coldfield in 1957, at the second and third World Scout Indabas and at the tenth World Scout Jamboree at Makiling Park in 1959. Ukrainian Scouters delegated by the Executive Council participated as observers in the sixteenth and seventeenth International Conferences in 1957 and 1959, respectively.

In 1957, Plast celebrated its 45th Anniversary with a national camp in their training and camping centre Plastova Sich in Canada. Oleksander Tysovsky took part in this camp.

In the summer of 1962, Ukrainian Scouting celebrated its 50th Anniversary with a National Jamboree on its own permanent campsite ("Vovcha Tropa") at East Chatham, New York, in which over 2,000 members, as well as Scouts of other national associations participated. Subsequent anniversaries were celebrated in 1967 at Batyrin, South Bolton, Quebec, and participants performed at Expo67 honoring the Canadian Centennial, and 1972 (again in East Chatham, New York), 1978 (Alberta, Canada) and every five years thereafter.

In 1976 Plast was among the founder members of the Associated International Scout and Guide Organizations in 1976. An umbrella organization for Scouts-in-Exile.

The location of Plast's global headquarters would vary based on the leadership elected at each Holovna Plastova Rada, although the centers of administration tended to be New York City and Toronto, Canada.

Plast was quite active in publishing, with the key publications:
 Hotuis (for novaky or New Scouts)
 Yunak (for yunaky or Scouts)
 Plastoviy Shliakj (for starshi plastuny and seniory, that is Older Scouts and Senior Scouts).
 Vohon' Orlynoyi Rady (for leaders and counselors to novaky)
 V dorohu z Yunatstvom (for leaders and counselors to yunaky)
 Av-u and Tam-Tam (for members of the Siromantsi fraternity)
 OX Kvartal'nyk (for members of the Orden Khrestonostsiv fraternity)
And numerous local, regional and fraternal bulletins, publications, journals and handbooks, many of which were published by Plast Publishing.

In addition to creating over a dozen campsites, Plast members built or acquired over 30 facilities or domivky where they could hold activities, generally on a weekly basis.  Several stores, including Molode Zhyttia in New York City, provided uniforms, emblems, publications and other goods.  Several foundations and organizations provided and continue to provide support.

Sixth Era: 1990 to present

When the Soviet Union began to crumble, Scouting appeared clandestinely.  The first Plast camp was organized in the summer of 1989 and was raided by the Soviet secret police (KGB); several Scouts were beaten and arrested.  Nevertheless, Scouting and Plast persisted.

Since the end of Soviet communism and the birth of an independent Ukraine in 1991, Ukrainian Plast Scouting has been growing rapidly in every corner of the country.  This included units in Kyiv, Lutsk and Donetsk.  The most active region, however, was in Lviv, where on 22 February 1990, the town council enacted the Statut Plastovoho Tovarystva.

Plast-in-Exile supported the restart of Plast in Ukraine.

At the beginning of 1995, there were 85 local groups and councils, with over 3,500 Scouts.

In August 1997, Plast Ukrainian Scouting celebrated the 85th anniversary since the first Scouting units appeared in Ukraine in 1911, with a Plast Jamboree at the renamed Sokil Plast Museum-Camp, attended by 700 Scouts from 34 units throughout Ukraine.  Highlights of this Jamboree included the inauguration the third Nachalniy Plastun (Chief Scout) in Plast's history, and the first ever inaugurated in Ukraine, Dr. Lubomyr Romankiw on 10 August 1997; the opening of the Museum at this historic campsite, donated by Metropolitan Andrey Sheptytsky, which had been used by Plast from 1924 to 1944; and the attendance of several Scouts from the First Era of Ukrainian Scouting, including the 93-year-old composer Mykola Kolessa.

In addition, other Scouting groups have been spontaneously appearing, mostly in the eastern and southern parts of Ukraine. Most of them participated, together with Plast, in the Ukrainian delegation to the 18th World Scout Jamboree in the Netherlands in 1995, as well as the First All-Ukrainian Scout Jamboree in Nevytske, and the Second Slavic Jamboree in Prague, Czech Republic.

33 Ukrainian Scouts were invited to take part in the 19th World Scout Jamboree in 1999.

Plast Publishing largely moved back to Ukraine, with financial and editorial support from international units, and publishes a magazine for both younger Scouts, Hotuys (Be Prepared), and for older Scouts Yunak. As with all Plast publications, these monthly publications are written in Ukrainian. They are also distributed internationally.

Seventh Era: Plast in XXI century 
As of 2006, Plast has over 10,000 members in Ukraine, and an additional 3,000 members in other countries.

The 95th anniversary jubilee (YUMPZ) occurred in August 2007, with a Zustrich at the Plastova Sich campsite in Grafton, Ontario, Canada. Over 1200 yunaky attended the camp, from 4 to 19 August. Tabir Pryhylnyky was at Camp Baturyn, just outside Montreal, Quebec. Tabir Uchasnyky was held in Algonquin Provincial Park, in central Ontario. Tabir Rosviduvachi was held in Samuel de Champlain Park, also in Ontario. Tabir Skobiv and Virlits was in Killarney Park, on Lake Huron, in western Ontario.

WOSM recognition
Plast is working with the various other Ukrainian Scouting organizations to develop a national Scouting federation and to achieve recognition by the World Organization of the Scout Movement. All duties in Ukrainian Scouting, from local to the National Council levels, are performed by a combination of volunteer workers and paid professionals.

In 2004, the Ukrainian Scout Youth Public Organization Spilka Pionerskykh Orhanizatzii Kyïva (literally Kyiv Pioneer Movement Organization or SPOK, with a membership of 3,750 in 18 of 26 Ukrainian oblasts) applied for WOSM membership. In January 2005, this motion was recommended by the World Scout Bureau. Since more than 5% of the National Scouting Organizations voted against the application, Germany and the Boy Scouts of America among the opposing votes, SPOK was not admitted to WOSM and withdrew the application. As a result of this, a special mission of the World Scout Committee was sent to Ukraine. Ukrainian Scouting endeavored to set up a new Scouting body unifying Plast and SPOK to satisfy WOSM requirements, to be worked out by 2008, as all parties were motivated to join the international community.

Following the recommendations of Resolution 2/05 adopted by the 37th World Scout Conference in Tunisia, the constitutive congress of the National Organization of Scouts of Ukraine (NOSU) was held on 27 March 2007. The congress, which gathered Scout representatives from most regions of Ukraine, approved the Constitution of NOSU and elected its governing bodies. This event was made possible thanks to efforts of three Scout associations (Plast, SPOK and Sich) to work towards unification of Scouting in Ukraine in a new single National Scout Organization so as to be able to join WOSM.

The Constitution of NOSU was officially registered by the Ministry of Justice of Ukraine in November 2007, thus confirming the creation of a single National Scout Organization in Ukraine. An amended version of this Constitution was received on 4 February 2008 and formally approved by the Constitutions Committee and the World Scout Committee.

WOSM Acting Secretary General Luc Panissod visited NOSU in mid-March 2008. He had the opportunity to meet and talk with various groups of young people (candidates to join, patrol leaders, summer camp young leaders) and adult leaders responsible of local Scout groups. He also met with the Deputy Minister of Family, Youth and Sports, one of the founding members of one of the Scout associations, who confirmed full support of the authorities to NOSU. He also had several working sessions with leaders of NOSU to assess the level of development of the organization.

The organization has a loaned headquarters and several campsites. Elements of a progressive scheme include merit badges, which are illustrated in their handbook and are obtained on a progressive basis. At present, NOSU is a small organization and has only one professional staff regularly employed in application of existing legislation. Being a new organization, NOSU still has to develop an efficient working organization.

NOSU membership is open to girls and boys, women and men, in three age sections: Cubs (6–10), Scouts (11–16) and Rovers (16–24). As of 31 December 2007, NOSU comprised 2,475 members including 718 female youth members, 1,546 male youth members, plus some 200 adult leaders and Council members.

NOSU membership is made approximately of 40% from Plast, 40% from SPOK and 20% from Sich. The same percentages are reflected at the National Council level. While double membership still exists (one can be member of NOSU and member of one of the three above associations), direct membership for new members is strongly encouraged. It is the objective of NOSU's leadership that NOSU will be successful enough to attract more members from the three associations who are not yet members of NOSU. Further unification of Scouting through integration of other Scout groups in Ukraine is envisaged through the chartering system.

The Chairman of the National Council is Lev Zakharchishin, the Deputy Chairman of the National Council is Valeriy Tantsiura and the International Commissioner is Andriy Chesnokov. In becoming a member of WOSM, NOSU will become, as it so desires, a member of the Eurasia Scout Region.

Outside of Ukraine

After World War II, a number of independent Plast Ukrainian Scouting organizations were founded in the West by Ukrainians from Western Ukraine (which was under Polish rule until 1939).  This era of Plast began in Germany and Austria in 1945 in various Displaced Persons Camps, and as various members of Plast eventually ended up in Canada, the United States, the UK, Australia and elsewhere, various émigré organizations were founded between 1946 and 1951.  Until the fall of the Soviet Union, these represented the totality of Plast organizations, and were aligned to a supranational organization called KUPO (Conference of Ukrainian Plast Organizations), which convened every four years and elected an operational "Holovna Plastova Starshyna" (HPB) and a board called "Holovna Plastova Rada" (HPR), and would also name the head Plastun ("Nachalniy Plastun"), typically a long-term or lifetime, and somewhat ceremonial position.  The current, and third, "Nachalniy Plastun" is US-based (originally from Edmonton, Alberta, Canada) Dr. Lubomyr Romankiw, his predecessor was US-based Dr. Yuriy Starosols'kiy, who succeeded Severyn Levytsky ("Siriy Lev"), who was inaugurated in post-World War II Germany.

Notable members
Stepan Bandera (1909–1959), Ukrainian politician and theorist of the militant wing of the Organization of Ukrainian Nationalists
Vera Farmiga (born 1973), American actress
Petro Franko (1890–1941), Ukrainian educator, writing, military leader, and politician 
Bohdan Hawrylyshyn (1926–2016), Canadian-Swiss-Ukrainian economist and political advisor
Viktor Hurniak (1987–2014), Ukrainian volunteer soldier and photographer
Lubomyr Husar (1933–2017), Ukrainian major archbishop
Nicholas S. H. Krawciw (1935-2021), American major general
Boris Lushniak, acting Surgeon General of the United States
Lubomyr Romankiw (born 1931), Ukrainian-American IBM Fellow and researcher
Roman Shukhevych (1907–1950), Ukrainian military leader and nationalist
Heidemarie Stefanyshyn-Piper (born 1963), American naval officer, engineer, and astronaut
Ulana Suprun (born 1963), Ukrainian-American physician, philanthropist, activist, and former Minister of Healthcare
Katheryn Winnick (born 1977), Canadian actress
Viktor Yushchenko (born 1954), former President of Ukraine (honorary)

Further reading

See also

 Scouting in Ukraine
 Scouting in displaced persons camps
 Ukrainian Sich Riflemen

Archives 
There is a Plast-Ukrainian Youth Association fonds at Library and Archives Canada. The archival reference number is R5103.

References

External links
 Plast Ukraine Website
 Plast Ukrainian Scouting Org. KPS-USA

Ukrainian-Canadian culture
Ukrainian diaspora
Scouting and Guiding in Ukraine
Youth organizations established in 1911
1911 establishments in Austria-Hungary